Albert Joseph Baciocco, Jr. (March 4, 1931 – May 22, 2015)  was a vice admiral in the United States Navy. He was a 1953 graduate of the United States Naval Academy. He served as Chief of Naval Research from 1978 to 1981 and Director of Research, Development, and Acquisition from 1983 to 1987.

Baciocco died in 2015. He was interred at the United States Naval Academy Cemetery.

References

1931 births
2015 deaths
People from San Francisco
United States Naval Academy alumni
Military personnel from California
United States Navy vice admirals
Burials at the United States Naval Academy Cemetery